Parliamentary elections were held in Syria on 10 and 11 February 1986. Members were elected using the multiple non-transferable vote in fifteen constituencies, with an average district magnitude of thirteen. The result was a victory for the Arab Socialist Ba'ath Party, which won 130 of the 195 seats.

Results

References

Syria
1986 in Syria
Parliamentary elections in Syria
Election and referendum articles with incomplete results